Haveley tram stop was a proposed tram stop on the phase 3b plans to Manchester Airport which would have been located immediately east of the M56 motorway. It was originally due to open in 2016 but was dropped from the plans.

References

External links
 Light Rail Transit Association
 Metrolink Airport Line
 Airport route map

Proposed Manchester Metrolink tram stops